Can Live Music (Live 1971–1977) is a double live album by the band Can, released in 1999 and recorded in the UK and West Germany between 1972 and 1977 (despite the title referencing 1971). It originally came as an item in the now out of print Can box set.

The album contains several tracks created through instantaneous free improvisation ("Jynx", "Fizz", "Colchester Finale" and "Kata Kong") that did not appear on any of Can's studio albums. "Spoon" is from same concert appearing on the film "Can Free Concert 1972" by Peter Przygodda, which was released to celebrate success of the Spoon-single.

Track listing
All songs written by Holger Czukay, Michael Karoli, Jaki Liebezeit and Irmin Schmidt, except where noted.

Disc one
 "Jynx" – 16:06  14th October 1975, Universität, Giessen 
 "Dizzy Dizzy" – 8:02 19th November 1975, Sussex University, Brighton 
 "Vernal Equinox" – 12:4419th November 1975, Sussex University, Brighton 
 "Fizz" (Czukay, Karoli, Liebezeit, Schmidt, Rosko Gee) – 6:272nd March 1977, University of Keele, Keele 
 "Yoo Doo Right" (Czukay, Karoli, Liebezeit, Schmidt, Malcolm Mooney) – 14:264 May 1975, Greyhound, Croydon 
 "Cascade Waltz" – 4:4823rd March 1977, Sound Circus, London

Disc two
 "Colchester Finale" including "Halleluhwah" (Czukay, Karoli, Liebezeit, Schmidt, Damo Suzuki) – 37:24 8 May 1972, University of Essex, Colchester 
 "Kata Kong" – 8:2821st November 1975, Hatfield Polytechnic, Hatfield 
 "Spoon" (Czukay, Karoli, Liebezeit, Schmidt, Suzuki) – 14:233rd February 1972, Sporthalle, Cologne

Personnel
Can
Holger Czukay – bass (1972–1975); short wave radio, sampler & electronic treatments (1977)
Michael Karoli – guitar, vocals
Jaki Liebezeit – drums, percussion
Irmin Schmidt – keyboards
Damo Suzuki – vocals (1972 only)
Rosko Gee – bass (1977 only)

References

Can (band) albums
1999 live albums